The following is a list of films produced by the Bollywood film industry based in Mumbai in 1971:

Top-grossing films
The top-grossing films at the Indian Box Office in 
1971:

A-Z

References

External links
 Bollywood films of 1971 at the Internet Movie Database

1971
Lists of 1971 films by country or language
Films, Bollywood